Johannes Antonsson (20 November 1921 – 25 August 1995) was a Swedish politician for the Centre Party. A member of the Riksdag from 1958 to 1979, he was minister for physical planning and local government from 1976 to 1978, and Governor of the province of Halland from 1979 to 1986. He also served as vice-chairman of the Centre Party from 1969 to 1979.

References

External links

1921 births
1995 deaths
Governors of Halland County
Members of the Riksdag from the Centre Party (Sweden)
Interior ministers of Sweden